Mobile phones with WVGA native display resolution have become common.  This is a list of phones that have such displays.

Wide VGA or WVGA an abbreviation for Wide Video Graphics Array is any display resolution with the same 480 pixel height as VGA but wider than 640 pixels, such as 800x480, 848x480, or 854x480.

The following mobile phones have WVGA displays:

Acer Liquid A1
Casio G'zOne Commando
Dell Streak
Dell Venue
Dell Venue Pro
Dell XCD35
HP Pre 3
HTC 7 Mozart
HTC 7 Pro
HTC 7 Surround
HTC 7 Trophy
HTC Desire
HTC Desire HD
HTC Desire S
HTC Desire Z
HTC Droid Incredible
HTC EVO 4G
HTC HD2
HTC HD7
HTC Inspire 4G
HTC ThunderBolt
HTC Titan
HTC Touch Diamond2
HTC Touch HD
HTC Touch Pro2
HTC One V
HTC One ST/SU
HTC Windows Phone 8S
HTC Desire V
HTC Desire X
Huawei Ascend G300
Intermec CN51
Karbonn A15
Kyocera Zio
LG GD880 Mini
LG GD900 Crystal
LG KM900 (Arena)
LG Optimus 2X
LG Optimus 3D
LG Optimus 7
LG Optimus Black
LG Optimus L7
LG Optimus Q
LG Quantum
LG Viewty Smart
LG VS740 (Ally)
Mito T300
Motorola Bravo
Motorola Defy
Motorola Droid | Sholes | Tao | A855 | Milestone A853
Motorola Droid 2
Motorola Droid X
Motorola Milestone XT701 (China, Taiwan and Hong Kong)
Motorola Triumph
Motorola XT720 (North America and Korea)
Nexus One
Nexus S
Nokia Lumia 520
Nokia Lumia 525
Nokia Lumia 610
Nokia Lumia 625
Nokia Lumia 710
Nokia Lumia 720
Nokia Lumia 800
Nokia Lumia 820
Nokia Lumia 900
Nokia N900
Nokia X2 Dual Sim
OlivePad VT 100
Panasonic T11
Panasonic T31
Pantech Vega Racer
Pantech Burst
Pantech Laser
Samsung Focus
Samsung Galaxy Ace 2
Samsung Galaxy Core Prime
Samsung Galaxy J1 (2015)
Samsung Galaxy J1 Ace
Samsung Galaxy J1 (2016)
Samsung Galaxy S | i9000
Samsung Galaxy S Advance
Samsung Galaxy S Duos
Samsung Galaxy S Duos 2
Samsung Galaxy S Duos 3
Samsung Galaxy S II | i9100 | i777
Samsung Galaxy S III Mini
Samsung Galaxy S Plus | i9001
Samsung Galaxy SL | i9003
Samsung Galaxy W
Samsung Galaxy Xcover 2
Samsung Galaxy Xcover 3
Samsung Infuse 4G
Samsung Omnia 7
Samsung Omnia II GT-I8000(H/L/U)
Samsung Omnia Pro B7610
Samsung Wave S8500
Samsung Wave II S8530 
Samsung Wave 3 S8600
Sony Ericsson Xperia X1
Sony Ericsson Xperia X2
Sony Ericsson Xperia X10
Sony Ericsson Xperia arc
Sony Ericsson Xperia arc S
Sony Ericsson Xperia ray
Sony Xperia sola
Sunberry SunTab
T-Mobile myTouch 4G
Toshiba Portégé G900
ZTE Blade (Orange San Francisco)

See also
Graphic display resolutions
List of mobile phones with FWVGA display; FWVGA (854x480) is a subset of WVGA. Phones with FWVGA displays may be found on both lists.

References

Lists of mobile phones
Computer display standards